Normandeau is a surname. Notable people with the surname include:

 Josette Normandeau (born 1968), Canadian television producer and martial artist
 Nathalie Normandeau (born 1968), Canadian politician
 Robert Normandeau (born 1955), Canadian composer

See also
 Fort Normandeau